Finland men's national goalball team is the men's national team of Finland.  Goalball is a team sport designed specifically for athletes with a vision impairment.  The team takes part in international competitions.

Paralympic Games  
 

At the 1980 Summer Paralympics in Arnhem, Netherlands, twelve teams took part.  The team finished seventh. New York hosted the 1984 Summer Paralympics where thirteen teams participated and the team finished tenth.

Regional championships 

The team competes in the IBSA Europe goalball region.  Groups A and C are held one year, and Group B the following year.  Strong teams move towards Group A.

References

Goalball men's
National men's goalball teams
Finland at the Paralympics
European national goalball teams